The Crowd Roars is a 1932 American pre-Code film directed by Howard Hawks starring James Cagney and featuring Joan Blondell, Ann Dvorak, Eric Linden, Guy Kibbee, and Frank McHugh. A film of the same name was made in 1938 with a different story, starring Robert Taylor.

The driver in the film's auto racing sequences was Harry Hartz, a successful board track and Indianapolis 500 race professional. It was remade in 1939 as Indianapolis Speedway with Pat O'Brien in Cagney's role, Ann Sheridan in Blondell's, and McHugh reprising his.

Plot
Motor racing champion Joe Greer returns home to compete in an exhibition race featuring his younger brother Eddie, who has aspirations of becoming a champion. Joe's obsession with "protecting" Eddie from women causes Joe to interfere with Eddie's relationship with Anne, leading to estrangement between Joe and Eddie, and between Joe and his longtime girlfriend Lee, who is made to feel "not good enough" to be around Eddie.

During the race, a third driver, Spud Connors, wrecks and is burned alive. Driving lap after lap through the flames and the smell of burning flesh while blaming himself for the accident, Joe loses his will to race. Eddie goes on to win. Afterward, Joe's career plummets as Eddie's rises. The power of love eventually triumphs, and Joe's career and his relationships with Lee and Eddie are rehabilitated.

Cast

Production
The Crowd Roars is loosely based on the play The Barker: A Play of Carnival Life by Kenyon Nicholson. Hawks developed the script with Seton Miller for their eighth and final collaboration and the script was by Miller, Kubec Glasmon, John Bright and Niven Busch. Blondell and Dvorak initially were cast in each other's roles but swapped after a few days of shooting. Shooting began on December 7, 1931 at Legion Ascot Speedway and wrapped on February 1, 1932. Hawks used real race car drivers in the film, including the 1930 Indianapolis 500 winner, Billy Arnold.

Certain scenes were filmed at the now defunct Nutley Velodrome race track in Nutley, New Jersey with Harry Hartz standing in for James Cagney. In original prints of the film the big racing scene at the end was printed on tinted "Inferno" stock. A French-language version, La foule hurle, starring Jean Gabin, was produced in 1932. Warner Bros. remade The Crowd Roars in 1939 as Indianapolis Speedway.

Sentimentalism is downplayed in this pre-Code film. The lingering stench of Spud's burning body is implied strongly by the horrified expression on each driver's face as he passes through the smoke and tongue of burning gasoline that marks the wreck site, sometimes pushing his scarf against his nose.

Box office
According to Warner Bros records, the film earned $524,000 domestically and $245,000 foreign.

Notes

External links
 
 
 
 
 

1932 films
1930s sports drama films
American sports drama films
Films directed by Howard Hawks
American black-and-white films
American auto racing films
Films about brothers
Films with screenplays by Kubec Glasmon
1932 drama films
Warner Bros. films
1930s English-language films
1930s American films